The men's hammer throw at the 2019 World Athletics Championships was held at the Khalifa International Stadium in Doha, Qatar, from 1 to 2 October 2019.

Summary
The finals opened with all but two already over 74 metres, three throwers over 76 metres, Eivind Henriksen, Wojciech Nowicki and Quentin Bigot; Bence Halász at 78.18m and Pawel Fajdek at 79.34m all in the first round.  The second round saw the rest of the field over 74, Bigot solidifying his hold on third with a 78.06m and Fajdek improving to 80.16m.  In the third, Henriksen challenged the podium with a 77.38m.  It took exactly 76 metres just to get three more throws.  In the fourth round Nowicki upped his challenge to 77.42m, Bigot edged into silver position with a 78.19m and then Fajdek landed the winner .  In the fifth round, Mykhaylo Kokhan threw a personal best 77.39m, then in the final frame, Nowicki dropped his best of 77.69m, originally not enough to get onto the podium.

However, after the competition, the Polish delegation protested the officials call on Halász in the first round, claiming his stepping outside of the circle, a foul, being missed.  On further review, IAAF decided the officials acted improperly but the early call affected the rest of way Halász performed in the competition.  Nowicki was awarded an additional bronze medal.

Records
Before the competition records were as follows:

Schedule
The event schedule, in local time (UTC+3), was as follows:

Results

Qualification
Qualification: Qualifying Performance 76.50 (Q) or at least 12 best performers (q) advanced to the final.

Final
The final was started on 2 October at 21:40.

References

Men's hammer throw
Hammer throw at the World Athletics Championships